Carpodetus is a genus of flowering plants in the Rousseaceae family. It was formerly considered to lie within the Escalloniaceae. Its species occur in New Guinea, New Zealand, Solomon Islands, and Vanuatu. The genus is characterised by small trees with alternate, evergreen leaves, bearing small white flowers with few stamens.

Species
Described species include:
Carpodetus amplus Reeder
Carpodetus arboreus (Lauterb. & K.Schum.) Schltr.
Carpodetus archboldianus Reeder
Carpodetus denticulatus (Ridl.) Reeder
Carpodetus flexuosus (Ridl.) Reeder
Carpodetus fuscus Reeder
Carpodetus grandiflorus Schltr.
Carpodetus major Schltr.
Carpodetus montanus (Ridl.) Reeder
Carpodetus pullei Schltr.
Carpodetus serratus J.R.Forst. & G.Forst.  New Zealand

Taxonomy
Carpodetus and its type species C. serratus were first described by father and son Forster in 1773 and placed in the Saxifragaceae. In 1934 it was assigned to the newly created Escalloniaceae by Hutchinson in his major revision of the dicotyledon families. In the APG III system, Carpodetus has been referred to the Rousseaceae.

Phylogeny
Carpodetus is the sister to the clade consisting of Abrophyllum and Cuttsia. Roussea is sister to the rest of the family and is geographically most distanced from the other genera. Most related to this family are the Campanulaceae. This results in the following phylogenetic tree.

Etymology

References

Rousseaceae
Asterales genera